Roza is the name of several inhabited localities in Russia.

Urban localities
Roza, Chelyabinsk Oblast, a work settlement in Korkinsky District of Chelyabinsk Oblast

Rural localities
Roza, Kirov Oblast, a village in Kobrsky Rural Okrug of Darovskoy District of Kirov Oblast
Roza, Kurgan Oblast, a settlement in Sychevsky Selsoviet of Vargashinsky District of Kurgan Oblast
Roza, Lipetsk Oblast, a settlement in Knyazhebaygorsky Selsoviet of Gryazinsky District of Lipetsk Oblast